Kim Min-jae (김민재) may refer to:

 Kim Min-jae (baseball) (born 1973),  South Korean third base coach for the Hanwha Eagles and former shortstop
 Kim Min-jae (actor, born 1979) (born 1979), South Korean actor
 Kim Min-jae (weightlifter) (born 1983), South Korean weightlifter
 Kim Min-jae (actor, born 1996) (born 1996), South Korean actor
 Kim Min-jae (footballer) (born 1996), South Korean footballer

See also
Kim Min-je (김민제; born 1989), South Korean footballer